Refugio del Lago Airport  is an airport serving the Termas de Puyehue resort area in the Los Lagos Region of Chile.

The airport is on the eastern shore of Puyehue Lake. West approach and departure are over the water. There is a large hill just south of the runway, and mountainous terrain to the south and east.

See also

Transport in Chile
List of airports in Chile

References

External links
OpenStreetMap - Refugio del Lago Airport
OurAirports - Refugio del Lago Airport
FallingRain - Refugio del Lago Airport

Airports in Chile